Established in 1698, the Attorney-General's Chambers of Bermuda is the main legal advisor to the federal government and makes laws accessible to the public. From 1698-1999, the Attorney-General was also the main prosecutor in all criminal matters that pertained to the Bermuda courts. Attorneys-General are appointed by the Governor per the Constitution. All were public officers until 1999 when Lois Browne-Evans was appointed as the island's first political Attorney-General through election. Due to Bermuda's decision to have a political Attorney-General, the Director of Public Prosecutions now handles all criminal matters. Even though there are now two distinct offices, the Attorney-General is also considered Bermuda's Minister of Legal Affairs.

List of attorneys general (since 1900) 

 Reginald Gray (1900-1919)
 Thomas Melville Dill (1920-1937)
 Joseph Trounsell Gilbert (1938-1952)
J. B. Pine (1954-1957)
 John C. Summerfield (1962-1971)
 Gerald D.M. Collett (1972-1981)
 Saul Froomkin (1981-1991)
 Walter Maddocks (1991-1995)
 Elliot Deighton Mottley (1995-1998)
 Lois Browne-Evans (1999-2003) [1st female]
 Larry Mussenden (2004-2006)
 Philip Perinchief (2006-2007)
 Kim Wilson (2007-2010)
 Michael Scott (2010-2011)
 Kim Wilson (2011-2012)
 Mark Pettingill (2012-2014)
 Trevor Moniz (2014-2017)
 Kathy Lynn Simmons (2017–present)

See also 

 Justice ministry
 Politics of Bermuda

References 

Justice ministries
Government ministers of Bermuda
British colonial attorneys general in the Americas
Attorneys General of Bermuda